"Choke" is Sepultura's tenth official single, and the first of three to be taken from the album Against, released in 1998. This is the band's first single with Derrick Green on vocals. It is still played in concerts. The video for the single was filmed at Green's first concert with the band, and can be found on the DVD Live In São Paulo. The cover artwork simply shows the four member of the band during the same performance.

It is their last single to chart in the United Kingdom, peaking at number 91.

Releases
The single was released on CD and 12" picture disc.

Track listing

CD
"Choke"
"Gene Machine/Don't Bother Me" (Bad Brains cover)
"Against" (demo version)

12" vinyl
"Choke"
"Gene Machine/Don't Bother Me" (Bad Brains cover)
"Against" (demo version)

Personnel
Derrick Green – lead vocals, rhythm guitar
Andreas Kisser – lead guitar
Paulo Jr. – bass
Igor Cavalera – drums
Produced by Howard Benson and Sepultura
Recorded and engineered by Carlo Bartolini
Mixed by Tim Palmer at Scream Studios, Studio City, California, USA 
Mixed by Howard Benson and Bobbie Brooks at The Gallery, Encino, California, USA
Mix assisted by James Saez and Mark Moncrief
Assistant engineered by David Bryant, Daniel Mantovani, Tosh Kasai, and James Bennett
Tape Op by Skye A.K. Correa

References

Sepultura songs
1999 singles
1998 songs
Song recordings produced by Howard Benson
Roadrunner Records singles
Songs written by Igor Cavalera
Songs written by Andreas Kisser
Songs written by Paulo Jr.